WYMC (1430 AM) is a radio station licensed to Mayfield, Kentucky, United States.  The station airs a full service oldies format and is owned by JDM Communications, Inc. WYMC is also heard on 93.9 FM through a translator in Mayfield, Kentucky.

References

External links
WYMC's official website

Oldies radio stations in the United States
YMC
Radio stations established in 1976
1976 establishments in Kentucky